Antonios Modinos (born 1924) was a Greek sailor. He competed in the Finn event at the 1952 Summer Olympics.

References

External links
 

1924 births
Possibly living people
Greek male sailors (sport)
Olympic sailors of Greece
Sailors at the 1952 Summer Olympics – Finn
Place of birth missing (living people)